Something's Going On is the sixteenth studio album by American country music artist Trace Adkins. It was released on March 31, 2017 via Wheelhouse Records.

Commercial performance
The album debuted at No. 35 on the Billboard 200, and No. 5 on Top Country Albums in its first week of release. It sold 13,400 copies (14,000 units including track and stream album equivalent units) in the first week, and a further 4,000 in the second week. The album has sold 38,500 copies in the US as of September 2017.

Track listing

Personnel
Adapted from AllMusic

Trace Adkins - lead vocals
Jim "Moose" Brown - keyboards
Perry Coleman - background vocals
Mickey Jack Cones - acoustic guitar, electric guitar, keyboards, programming, background vocals
Dan Dugmore - steel guitar
Shelly Fairchild - background vocals
Jeneé Fleenor - fiddle
Derek George - background vocals
Kenny Greenberg - electric guitar
Tony Harrell - keyboards
Wes Hightower - background vocals
Mark Hill - bass guitar
Mike Johnson - steel guitar
Jeff King - electric guitar
Troy Lancaster - electric guitar
B. James Lowry - acoustic guitar
Angela Primm - background vocals
Adam Tefteller - background vocals
Brady Tilow - programming
Solomon Williams - background vocals
Lonnie Wilson - drums
Nir Z. - drums

Charts

References

2017 albums
Trace Adkins albums
BBR Music Group albums